Dayglo and similar usually mean:
Day-Glo Color Corp., an American paint and pigments manufacturer which owns the Day-Glo (DayGlo) registered trademark
Luminous paint, paint that exhibits luminescence
Blacklight paint, more specifically

Dayglo may also mean:
Rufus Dayglo, a London-based comics artist working for 2000 AD in the United Kingdom, and IDW Publishing in the United States

Music
Dayglo Abortions, a punk rock band from Victoria, British Columbia
Dayglow, an indie rock project from Aledo, Texas
Dayglo (album), a 1992 album, the first full-length album by Love Battery
Day-Glo (Based on a True Story), a 2022 by Erasure

"The Day The World Turned Dayglo", a song on the X-Ray Spex album Germfree Adolescents
"Dayglo Reflection", a song on the Bobby Womack album The Bravest Man in the Universe